The South Yemen Cup was an association football knock-out cup competition ran and overseen by the Yemen Football Association (YFA). It lasted for one season played in 1984.

Finals

External links 
 South Yemen Cup results RSSSF

 

Defunct football cup competitions in Yemen
1984 in Yemen
Yem
1984 in South Yemen